In Vietnamese secondary education, High Schools for the Gifted or Specialized High Schools (Trường Trung học phổ thông chuyên or Trường THPT chuyên) are designated public schools for secondary students to express gifted potentials in natural sciences, social sciences, and/or foreign languages. Schools for the gifted fall into two categories: provincial schools and university-affiliated schools. The first high schools for the gifted were initiated in 1966, and since then each province of Vietnam now has at least one high school for the gifted. Entrance to a high school for the gifted are based on test results and is extremely competitive.

In the early times, schools for the gifted focused on natural sciences (mostly Mathematics, followed by Physics, Chemistry, and Information technology). With the increase in competition in other fields like social sciences (History, Geography, Vietnamese literature), gifted schools nowadays are broader in terms of majors such as English, Biology, etc. Gifted schools often produce high secondary graduation rates and university entrance results, as well as numerous national and international academic prizes (including the International Science Olympiad).

List of high schools for the gifted in Vietnam 
As mentioned above, high schools for the gifted in Vietnam are divided into two categories: provincial and university-affiliated.

University-affiliated schools

Provincial high schools for the gifted 
Note: The following list is sorted alphabetically by location rather than name

List of disbanded schools

References 

High schools for the gifted in Vietnam